Aunt Dan and Lemon is a play by Wallace Shawn. The world premiere was produced by the New York Shakespeare Festival (Joseph Papp, producer) at the Royal Court Theatre in London, England on August 27, 1985, under the direction of Max Stafford-Clark. This production opened off-Broadway at The Public Theater on October 21, 1985.  It received a New York revival off-Broadway in 2004 at the Acorn Theatre, directed by Scott Elliot. The play returned to London’s Royal Court Theatre in 2009 when Jane Horrocks took the lead role. This production received mixed reviews.

Cast
Original 1985 cast
 Aunt Dan - Linda Hunt
 Lemon - Kathryn Pogson
Mother/June/Flora - Linda Bassett
Father/Freddie/Jasper - Wallace Shawn
Mindy - Lynsey Baxter
Marty/Andy - Larry Pine
Raimondo - Mario Arrambide

2004 revival cast
 Aunt Dan - Kristen Johnston
 Lemon - Lili Taylor
Marty - Maulik Pancholy

Plot synopsis
Lemon, a reclusive young woman with an unspecified chronic illness, sits in her apartment reading books about Nazism and reliving her life story. But as she tells the audience, that life story consists mostly of stories she herself was told in childhood by "Aunt Dan", a family friend. In flashback we see the miserable marriage of Lemon's parents and the child's eagerness for escape through Dan's stories.

Dan is a charismatic, eccentric figure, who tells the girl of her love affairs with women but also of an intense imaginary romance with Henry Kissinger. Dan's worldview is an application of Kissinger's doctrine of realpolitik to private life—amoral, ruthless, and seeing all relationships in terms of dominance and submission.  As the play continues, Dan's stories become more bizarre, including one in which she conspires with a gangster's moll to murder a policeman. Lemon's inarticulate mother tries to stand up for the value of compassion, but she fails and is made to look foolish and weak by Dan's eloquence.

Dan is transformed, however, when she becomes ill some years later. Tended lovingly by a nurse, she comes to feel for the first time a sense of loving connection with the world. Lemon is bewildered and alienated by this change in her mentor, and Dan dies soon afterward.

Now an invalid herself, Lemon gains no similar insight from her illness or from her memories. Continuing her study of Nazism, she decides that compassion is simply a lie people tell to comfort themselves, and that this lie is only possible because the powerful of the world have taken on the burden of necessary violence. She concludes with the thought that ordinary people owe killers like Hitler and Kissinger a debt of gratitude for making their self-deceit possible.

Trivia
On Mystery Science Theater 3000 in the episode Swamp Diamonds, the Mads are called "Aunt Dan and Lemon".

References

1985 plays
Plays set in the United States
Plays by Wallace Shawn